The Cameron Glaciers are several ice bodies located on Mount Cameron in the Olympic Mountains in Olympic National Park. The ice bodies in the easternmost, northeast-oriented cirque are the smallest, while the glacier just to the west is the largest. The westernmost two ice bodies are roughly equal in surface area. All bodies of ice located in these cirques are separated by arêtes. Meltwater from the glacier eventually enters Cameron Creek located to the north.

See also
List of glaciers in the United States

References

Glaciers of the Olympic Mountains
Glaciers of Jefferson County, Washington
Glaciers of Washington (state)